Band-e Heydar Abbas (also Romanized as Band-e Ḩeydar ‘Abbās) is a village in Mosaferabad Rural District, Rudkhaneh District, Rudan County, Hormozgan Province, Iran. At the 2006 census, its population was 31, in 6 families.

References 

Populated places in Rudan County